The international Wiener Werkstattpreis is a literary award established in 1992 in Austria. Since 2000, the award has been given annually. The organizers hope to bring public attention to writers who are not well known.

The grand prize is €1,100, with a second prize of €800 awarded by the audience. In 2007, authors could compete in three categories: short story, poetry and essay.  Supported and partly financed by the Austrian government and the city administration of Vienna, the award is organized by the publisher FZA.

Awardees 
2010 Birgit van der Leeden
2009 Wolfgang Ellmauer and Markus Thiele
2008 Axel Görlach
2007 Klaus Ebner (main price and winner in the categories short story and essay)Winner in the category poetry: Norbert Sternmut
2006 Constantin Göttfert
2005 Felician Siebrecht
2004 Ingeborg Woitsch and Daniel Mylow
2003 Uljana Wolf
2002 Susanne Wagner
2001 Olaf Kurtz
2000 Christine Thiemt
1994 Franzobel

External links 
Announcement Wiener Werkstattpreis

Austrian literary awards
Awards established in 1992
1992 establishments in Austria